Jarki is a village and deh in Matli taluka of Badin District, Sindh. As of 2017, it has a population of 2,706, in 516 households. It is part of the tapedar circle of Additional Maban.

References

Populated places in Badin District